Sweepings is a 1933 American pre-Code drama film directed by John Cromwell, written by Lester Cohen, and starring Lionel Barrymore, Eric Linden, William Gargan, Gloria Stuart and Alan Dinehart. It was released on April 14, 1933, by RKO Pictures.

Plot
Young, ambitious Daniel Pardway opens a store in Chicago called the Bazaar. Each time his wife Abigail gives birth, he adds a department to his store, dreaming of eventually putting his grown child in charge of that department. After the birth of his fourth offspring, he is left widowed. He raises his three sons and one daughter the best he can, denying them nothing. Meanwhile, his business grows into a huge department store.

General manager Abe Ullman has been with Pardway since the beginning and devoted himself completely to the store, so much so that he is unmarried and alone. One day, he asks Pardway for a share of the business, but Daniel refuses. He wants it all to go to his children.

When they are all adults, he turns to each of his sons in turn (he dismisses his daughter because she is a girl), but all of them prove unwilling or unable to manage the store. Gene, the eldest, prefers to be a playboy, drinking and keeping a mistress. Bert, next in age, dutifully accepts the position of assistant general manager, but is a plodder. Eventually, he tells his father he is happier as a window dresser, so Daniel lets him do that job. Freddie, the youngest, seduces one of the Bazaar saleswomen; Daniel has to pay her off to keep silent. (Freddie eventually leaves and wanders the world as a hobo.) Nevertheless, after incorporating the store, Daniel gives all four a tenth share of the business. 

Aging, Daniel tells Abe that his job is secure as long as he is alive, but once his children inherit the store, he will be out. A resentful Abe then tells him that he secretly bought the shares of some of Daniel's offspring.

When Daniel is on his deathbed, his sons and daughter are summoned. Daniel tells them he is disappointed in all of them, and that if they do not prove worthy within six months, he is leaving his majority share to Abe. After Daniel dies, Freddie promises to try.

Cast 
 Lionel Barrymore as Daniel Pardway
 Eric Linden as Freddie Pardway
 William Gargan as Gene Pardway
 Gloria Stuart as Phoebe
 Alan Dinehart as Thane Pardway 
 Gregory Ratoff as Abe Ullman
 Helen Mack as Mamie Donahue
 Lucien Littlefield as Grimson
 George Meeker as Bert Pardway
 Ninetta Sunderland as Abigail Pardway
 Esther Muir as Violet
 Franklin Pangborn Photographer (uncredited)

Connection to real people 
The Daniel Pardway character is based on Marshall Field, American founder of the Chicago-based department store chain.

References

External links 
 
 
 
 

1933 films
1933 drama films
1930s English-language films
1930s American films
American drama films
American black-and-white films
Films based on American novels
Films directed by John Cromwell
Films set in Chicago
Films set in department stores
RKO Pictures films